Hinomotentomon is a genus of proturans in the family Protentomidae. It is found in Southern Asia.

Species
 Hinomotentomon nipponicum (Imadaté, 1964)

References

Protura
Arthropods of Asia